Karomia gigas is a species of plant in the family Lamiaceae. It is found in Kenya and Tanzania, where only small populations survive.

In 2016 Botanic Gardens Conservation International found six Karomia gigas trees in one location in Tanzania. They employed local Tanzanians to guard the trees and report if there were any seeds so that they could be cultivated in a Tanzanian botanical garden.

References

Lamiaceae
Flora of Kenya
Flora of Tanzania
Critically endangered plants
Taxonomy articles created by Polbot